Alberta Boatema Ampomah (born 3 November 1994 in Accra) is a Ghanaian weightlifter. She represented Ghana at the 2012 Summer Olympics held in London, United Kingdom. She has represented Ghana at the weightlifting women's 75 kg category at the 2010 Commonwealth Games in Delhi, India. She placed third in the clean and jerk division at the African Olympic qualifiers, but received a wild card entry for the Olympic games.

References

External links
PeaceFMOnline.com
 

1994 births
Living people
Ghanaian female weightlifters
Olympic weightlifters of Ghana
Weightlifters at the 2010 Commonwealth Games
Commonwealth Games competitors for Ghana
Weightlifters at the 2012 Summer Olympics
20th-century Ghanaian women
21st-century Ghanaian women